Mankato is a ghost town in Boyd County, Nebraska, United States.

History
A post office was established at Mankato in 1890, and remained in operation until it was discontinued in 1901. It was likely named after Mankato, Minnesota.

References

Geography of Boyd County, Nebraska